Nicky Nyarko-Dei (born 9 October 1984), known by his stage name Tempa T, is a British grime MC originating from East London. He is well known for his 2009 single "Next Hype" which is considered an anthem of the UK underground scene. Due to this song Tempa T is particularly known for his excitable nature, aggressive lyrics, love of word play and the use of the phrases "hype" and "par". He is featured on "Hypest Hype" by Chase & Status. Tempz is a former member of east London-based grime crew Slew Dem. In 2015, Tempa T released the single, "Shell", which reached number one for eight weeks in the UK Grime Chart show with DJ Cameo on BBC Radio 1xtra, the track was produced by up and coming producers, So Real Sounds.

Early career
His first public performance was in 2006 with Mike Crosby from Greater Manchester, SlewDem at The Chantelle Fiddy club night at 333 in Shoreditch. In 2007 he made himself known and recognised as the ‘angry Grime MC’ and ‘The hype man’, with his high energy and infectious stage presence. Tempa T's musical career was documented by Neo-Publishing.Inc in 2010 in Tempa T: Reviewing the Hype so Far. In May 2014 Tempa T announced his debut album Pre the Baitness for release in July of the same year.

Discography

Albums

Mixtapes

EPs

Singles

As a featured artist

Filmography

He appeared in the 2010 British film Shank as himself, performing "Next Hype" on Tim and Barry TV.

He appeared in the 2016 British film Gangsters, Gamblers and Geezers, as a member of the gym.

Personal life
He is a supporter of Manchester United F.C.

References

External links

A short Tempa T interview and documentary

1984 births
Living people
English male rappers
English people of Ghanaian descent
Grime music artists
Date of birth unknown
People from Forest Gate
Rappers from London